Maguan Town may refer to the following towns in China:
Maguan, Chongqing (马灌), in Zhong County, Chongqing
Maguan, Gansu (马关), in Zhangjiachuan Hui Autonomous County, Gansu
Maguan, Guizhou (马官), in Puding County, Guizhou

See also
Maguan County, a county in Wenshan Zhuang and Miao Autonomous Prefecture, Yunnan, China